Nissen is a surname. As a Danish surname it is a patronymic meaning "son of Nis" (Danish short form of Nicholas). Notable people with the surname include:

Georg Nikolaus von Nissen (1761–1826), Danish diplomat and writer, and author of one of the first biographies of Wolfgang Amadeus Mozart
Johanna Nissen (1789–1865), mother of Johannes Brahms 
Fernanda Nissen (born 1995), Norwegian literary critic and politician
Peter Norman Nissen (1871–1930), Canadian mining engineer
Hans-Hermann Nissen (1893–1980), German bass-baritone
Rudolph Nissen (1896–1981), German surgeon and inventor of the Nissen fundoplication
Greta Nissen (born 1906-1988), Norwegian-American ballerina and actress
George Nissen (1914–2010) inventor of the modern trampoline
Henry Nissen (born 1948 as Henry Nissenbaum), German/Australian boxer of the 1970s
Steven Nissen (born 1949), heart specialist and chairman of cardiovascular medicine at the Cleveland Clinic
Ulli Nissen (born 1959), German politician
Dian Nissen (born 1961), American trampoline champion
Tom Nissen (born 1971), American convicted murderer and character in the 1999 film Boys Don't Cry
Carolina Nissen (born 1976), Chilean singer
Christopher Nissen (born 1992), Danish singer
Anja Nissen (born 1995), Danish-Australian singer

Danish-language surnames
Norwegian-language surnames